Joseph Clark Fitzgibbon (born August 27, 1986) is an American politician of the Democratic Party. He is a member of the Washington House of Representatives, representing the 34th district since 2011. 

Fitzgibbon has been chair of the House Environment and Energy Committee since 2015. He has championed several major bills to fight climate change, including the Clean Energy Transformation Act, requiring 100% clean energy in Washington; the low-carbon fuel standard; and the Climate Commitment Act, which will reduce carbon emissions with an emissions trading system.

References

External links
 

1986 births
21st-century American politicians
Democratic Party members of the Washington House of Representatives
Principia College alumni
Living people